Baxter Timothy Smelzer (March 27, 1852 – January 17, 1932) was an American physician and politician from New York.

Life 
Smelzer was born on March 27, 1852 in Lodi, New York, the son of Philip Smelzer and Matilda (Meeker) Bedell.

Smelzer attended Genesee Wesleyan Seminary in Lima and Syracuse University. He studied medicine at the University of Michigan Medical School in Ann Arbor, Michigan and Bellevue Hospital in New York City, graduating from the latter in 1874. He then began practicing medicine in Havana, later known as Montour Falls. He served as president of the village board of trustees, and was a member and president of the board of education. He specialized in surgery, and was a member of the State and County Medical Association as well as Elmira Academy of Medicine.

In 1893, Smelzer was elected to the New York State Senate as a Republican, representing New York's 24th State Senate district (Schuyler, Seneca, Chemung, and Steuben Counties). He served in the Senate in 1894 and 1895. While in the Senate, he was chairman of a committee appointed to investigate the State Board of Health, was instrumental in passing the Public Health Law and other bills related to the medical profession, and secured appropriations for Schuyler County and a new charter for the city of Elmira. In 1895, he was appointed Secretary of the State Board of Health, an office he held until 1901. From 1901 to 1907, he worked as a medical expert for the New York State Department of Health. He then moved to Albany and practiced medicine there.

In 1876, Smelzer married Lucy Huntington Tracy. They had a son, C. Tracy. He was a member of Psi Upsilon.

Smelzer died in his Albany home on January 17, 1932. He was buried in Montour Cemetery.

References

External links 

 Baxter T. Smelzer at Find A Grave

1852 births
1932 deaths
People from Lodi, New York
People from Montour Falls, New York
Genesee Wesleyan Seminary alumni
University of Michigan Medical School alumni
Bellevue Hospital Medical College alumni
19th-century American physicians
20th-century American physicians
American surgeons
Physicians from Albany, New York
19th-century American politicians
Republican Party New York (state) state senators
Burials in New York (state)